Scientist in the Kingdom of Dub is an album recorded and released in 1981 by the dub musician Scientist. Recorded at Channel One Studios in Kingston, Jamaica, the album was produced by Roy Cousins. It was released by Kingdom Records.

Track listing
"18 Drumalie Avenue Dub"
"Next Door Dub"
"305 Spanish Town Road Dub"
"13 Bread Lane Dub"
"14 Grass Quit Glade Dub"
"11 Guava Road Dub"
"Kingdom Dub"
"Chariot Dub"
"Thunder Lightning Dub"
"Disciple Dub"
"Jerusalem Dub"
"Burning Sun Dub"

Personnel
 Sly Dunbar – drums
 Carlton "Santa" Davis – drums
 Ranchie McLean – Guitar
 Noel "Sowell" Bailey – Guitar
 Robbie Shakespeare – Bass
 Pablo Black – Piano
 Ansel Collins – Organ
 Skully – Percussion

External links 

Discogs: https://www.discogs.com/Scientist-In-The-Kingdom-Of-Dub/release/440190

Scientist (musician) albums
1981 albums
Dub albums